Jordan James Spence (born 24 May 1990) is an English professional footballer who most recently played for ADO Den Haag in the Eredivisie. Predominantly as a right-back, Spence can also operate as a centre-back. He has represented and captained England at various youth levels. He has previously played for West Ham United, Leyton Orient, Scunthorpe United, Bristol City, Sheffield Wednesday, Milton Keynes Dons and Ipswich Town.

Club career

West Ham United and loans

Spence joined West Ham United in 2004. In April 2006, he signed a contract as a full-time youth team academy player for the 2006–07 season, and made his reserve team debut that same month. He has captained the England national team at every youth level.

On 9 May 2010, Spence made his first team debut for West Ham, coming on in the 86th minute for Alessandro Diamanti, in a 1–1 home draw against Manchester City. Spence made his first start for West Ham on 15 May 2011 in a 3–2 away defeat by Wigan Athletic, a game which saw West Ham relegated. After their relegation, Spence signed a new contract with the club, keeping him there until 2014.

In the 2012–13 season, Spence appeared in the club's first team on seven occasions, though he spent most of the season playing in the club's reserve team. Spence made his first appearance of the season in the second round of League Cup, in a 2–0 win over Crewe Alexandra on 28 August 2012, and then made his first league appearance of the season, coming on as substitute for James Tomkins in the late second-half, in a 4–1 win over Southampton on 20 October 2012. After nine years with the club, Spence was released at the end of the 2013–14 season.

Leyton Orient (loan)
Before making his debut for West Ham, he made his professional club debut for Leyton Orient in their FA Cup second round match at Bradford City on 29 November 2008 having signed on loan on 25 November. This looked to be his only match for Leyton Orient as he returned to Upton Park on 5 January 2009, but he returned to Orient on 23 January and stayed until the end of the season. His Football League debut came in the 2–1 away defeat by Scunthorpe United on 24 January 2009.

Scunthorpe United (loan)
Spence signed for Scunthorpe United on a one months loan on 17 August 2009 making his debut on 18 August in a 2–0 home defeat by Middlesbrough. On 29 August Spence's loan at Scunthorpe was extended until 1 January 2010. At the end of December 2009 his loan ended and he returned to West Ham having played eleven times for Scunthorpe.

Bristol City (loan)
On 3 March 2011, Spence signed on a 28-day loan for Championship side Bristol City, making his debut on 5 March in the 4–1 away victory over Coventry City. On 30 March, this loan was extended until the end of the 2010–11 season. On 4 May 2011, West Ham manager Avram Grant recalled Spence for him to provide back-up for defenders for the Premier League season run-in.

On 3 August 2011, Spence rejoined Bristol City for a season-long loan, with the option for West Ham to recall him from January 2012. Spence's first game after signing for the club on loan for the second time came in the opening game of the season, in a 3–0 loss against Ipswich Town. However, Spence's playing time was soon reduced under the management of Derek McInnes and was an un-used substitute bench for two matches before being left out of the squad for three months. In April 2012, Spence returned to West Ham having played 10 games for Bristol City.

Sheffield Wednesday (loan)
On 31 August 2013, Spence signed on an emergency loan for Championship side Sheffield Wednesday. On the same day, Spence made his Sheffield Wednesday debut, where he made his first start, in a 1–1 draw against Middlesbrough.

Spence played four games for Sheffield Wednesday before returning to West Ham United at the end of September 2013.

Milton Keynes Dons
Spence joined Milton Keynes Dons on a one-month loan on 24 October 2013. He made his debut on 26 October in a 3–2 away defeat by Tranmere Rovers. Although Spence gave away a penalty, manager Karl Robinson described Spence's debut as "wonderful". He scored his first career goal at club level on 26 November 2013 in a 3–1 away defeat by Colchester United. After playing 12 games for Milton Keynes Dons, Spence returned to West Ham in January 2014. On 30 January 2014, Spence re-joined Milton Keynes Dons on loan until the end of the 2013–14 season. Spence's first game after signing for the club on loan for the second time came on 1 February 2014, in a 1–0 loss against Tranmere Rovers, the same club he played against for the first time. Spence scored for the club for the second time this season, in a 3–2 win over Stevenage on 22 March 2014. Spence went on to finish the 2013–14 season, making twenty-nine appearances and scoring two times.

Despite interests from Championship clubs, it was announced on 21 August 2014, Spence joined Milton Keynes Dons on a permanent deal, signing a one-year contract with a further option of extending for another year. Spence's first game after signing for the club on a permanent basis came on 31 August 2014, coming on as a substitute for Dean Bowditch in the 72nd minute, in a 2–0 loss against Crawley Town. During the season, Spence found himself, competing over a right-back position spot with Lee Hodson and George Baldock throughout the 2014–15 season. Despite this, Spence played 38 games for Milton Keynes Dons in the 2014–15 season as they won promotion to the Championship, as runners-up. Milton Keynes opted to take up their option of a contract extension that would ensure Spence remained under contract for the 2015–16 season.

In the 2015–16 season, Spence continued to be in the right-back position at the start of the season and continued to regain his first team place until he was suspended for a third round replay of FA Cup, in a 3–0 win over Northampton Town on 19 January 2016. After this, Spence soon lost his first team place in the right-back position following the emergence of Baldock as the season progressed. Despite this, Spence finished the 2015–16 season, making 33 appearances, as they were relegated back to League One after a season. On 12 May 2016, Spence was released from the club after it was announced his contract would not be renewed.

Ipswich Town
After being rejected after his initial trial at the club during the early stages of the 2016–17 season, and then being similarly rejected by both Rotherham United and Birmingham City, on 16 January 2017, he signed a deal until the end of the season with Ipswich Town. Spence scored his first goal for the club on 15 August 2017, a late header from a free kick, to clinch a 4–3 victory for Ipswich over Millwall. He was released at the end of the 2018–19 season.

ADO Den Haag
In January 2020, Spence joined Dutch team ADO Den Haag on a contract until the end of the 2019–20 season. He was released in July after the expiration of his contract and due to the Eredivise season being ended by the COVID-19 pandemic.

International career
Spence captained the England U16s to the Victory Shield in November 2005, then led England U17 to the Final of the Nordic Tournament, playing in the Faroe Islands in August 2006 and scoring in his second match. England finished at the top of their 4-team group, but lost the Final to Denmark in Tórshavn.

In 2007, he was named in U17s coach John Peacock's squad for the Elite qualifying round of the Under-17 European Championships against Serbia, Bosnia and Herzegovina, and Azerbaijan.

In 2007, Spence captained England in the 2007 FIFA U-17 World Cup. This was the first time the country had reached the World Finals, at this age group. Against Brazil in injury time he scored a late winner, which put England through to the last 16, this was the first time England had beaten Brazil at a FIFA tournament.
On 20 November 2007 Spence captained the England U18 team in a 2–0 victory over Ghana. He made his first appearance for the England U19 team in their 6–0 victory over Romania on 14 October 2007 The England U18 team finished the 2007–08 season unbeaten, under Spence's captaincy, with a 2–0 win over Austria on 16 April 2008.

In the 2008–09 season, Spence continued to be involved with the England under-19 team, helping them to qualify for the UEFA U19 Championships in the summer of 2009, in which they finished runners up. In March 2011, Spence made his England U21 debut in a 2–1 defeat by Iceland.

Personal life
In June 2014, he married actress Naomi Scott after four years of dating.

Career statistics

Honours
Milton Keynes Dons
Football League One runner-up: 2014–15

References

External links

1990 births
Living people
Footballers from Woodford, London
English footballers
England youth international footballers
England under-21 international footballers
West Ham United F.C. players
Leyton Orient F.C. players
Scunthorpe United F.C. players
Bristol City F.C. players
Sheffield Wednesday F.C. players
Milton Keynes Dons F.C. players
Ipswich Town F.C. players
ADO Den Haag players
Premier League players
English Football League players
Eredivisie players
Black British sportspeople
Association football defenders
Expatriate footballers in the Netherlands
English expatriate footballers